The women's 10,000 metres at the 2007 All-Africa Games were held on July 21.

Results

References
Results

10000